Ekaterina Miklashevich (born 25 January 1992) is a Belarusian footballer who plays as a goalkeeper for Russian Top Division club WFC Lokomotiv Moscow and the Belarus women's national team.

Club career
Miklashevich has played for FC Minsk and Bobruichanka Bobruisk in Belarus and for Lokomotiv Moscow in Russia.

International career
Miklashevich capped for Belarus at senior level during the UEFA Women's Euro 2022 qualifying.

References

1992 births
Living people
Belarusian women's footballers
Women's association football defenders
Women's association football goalkeepers
FC Minsk (women) players
Bobruichanka Bobruisk players
WFC Lokomotiv Moscow players
Russian Women's Football Championship players
Belarus women's international footballers
Belarusian expatriate footballers
Belarusian expatriate sportspeople in Russia
Expatriate women's footballers in Russia